Streptomyces daliensis is a bacterium species from the genus of Streptomyces which has been isolated from soil in Dali in the Yunnan Province in China.

See also 
 List of Streptomyces species

References

Further reading 
 

daliensis
Bacteria described in 2012